Rita Saraiva (born 21 November 1992) is a Congolese handball player for US Cagnes Handball and the Congolese national team.

She represented Congo at the 2021 World Women's Handball Championship in Spain.

References

1992 births
Living people
Congolese female handball players